Ma Kwu Lam is a village of the Shap Sze Heung area of Sai Kung North, in Tai Po District, Hong Kong.

Administration
Ma Kwu Lam is a recognized village under the New Territories Small House Policy.

History
At the time of the 1911 census, the population of Ma Kwu Lam was 63. The number of males was 27.

References

External links

 Delineation of area of existing village Ma Kwu Lam (Sai Kung North) for election of resident representative (2019 to 2022)

Villages in Tai Po District, Hong Kong
Sai Kung North